Celaenorrhinus intermixtus is a species of butterfly in the family Hesperiidae. It is found in Cameroon, the Democratic Republic of the Congo, Uganda, Kenya and Tanzania. The habitat consists of forests.

Subspecies
Celaenorrhinus intermixtus intermixtus (Cameroon, Democratic Republic of the Congo: Shaba)
Celaenorrhinus intermixtus evansi Berger, 1975 (Uganda, Democratic Republic of the Congo: Ituri, western Kenya, north-western and northern Tanzania)

References

Butterflies described in 1896
intermixtus
Butterflies of Africa
Taxa named by Per Olof Christopher Aurivillius